Blaze and Satanus are twin fictional demonic siblings appearing in American comic books published by DC Comics. Blaze first debuted in Action Comics #655 (July 1990), created by Roger Stern and Brett Breeding and first pencilled by Bob McLeod. Later, Satanus was created by Brett Breeding and debuted in The Adventures of Superman #493 (August 1992) by Jerry Ordway and Tom Grummett. The twin duo originally starred as Superman villains associated with the supernatural but were later revealed to be the children of the Wizard Shazam, Blaze respectively depicted as a powerful enemy of the Marvel Family.

Fictional character biographies

Origin 
Blaze and Satanus are demonic hybrid children of the Wizard Shazam and an unnamed Hellhound demoness who assumed human form in order to seduce Jebediah during his time as Champions of the Cannite gods, calling himself Vlarem or the Champion. Shortly after their birth, the twin children would be banished by the Cannite gods along with their mother back to their home netherwolf, having found his act to be displeasing as Jebediah learned the lesson to resisting sexual temptation. However, the two would embrace their demonic heritage and forsake their humane one, with Blaze holding the most hatred for their father.

Conflicts with Superman and other heroes 
Later in her life, Blaze is involved in the creation of Superman's enemies the Silver Banshee and Skyhook. A red-skinned demoness with horns, she disguises herself as Metropolis nightclub owner Angelica Blaze in order to steal souls. In one altercation, Superman follows her to Hell to fight for the souls of Jimmy Olsen and Perry White's son Jerry (who, in fact, was the son of Perry's wife Alice and Lex Luthor). Superman manages to save Jimmy Olsen, but Blaze succeeds in killing Jerry White, whose selfless sacrifice saves his soul.

Conversely, Satanus resembles a traditional demon, with large horns that protrude from the front of his head and dark red skin. He wears a heavy Roman-style helmet which buries his face in shadow. Blaze and Satanus fight each other for possession of Blaze's domain, using Superman as a pawn. Satanus has an Earthly identity and disguises himself as Collin Thornton, the publisher of Newstime magazine, who had previously hired Clark Kent as editor. At one point, Blaze also clashed with Jared Stevens.

In the Powers of Shazam!, Blaze appears as the main antagonist in the first few arcs of the book, being responsible for the creation of Sinclair Batson, the rich cousin of Billy Batson who vehemently denies relations, through the wishes of his corrupt uncle, Ebeneezer Batson. She also plots to extract her revenge on her father as well as release the ultimate evil entity dwelling within the Rock of Eternity. She teams up with Black Adam but is foiled by the combined might of Captain Marvel, Mary Marvel, and many of his allies in the process.  Satanus also appears as a ally to foil his sister although he later returns to rescue her from certain doom.

Underworld Unleashed

Blaze and Satanus are two of the many supervillains involved in the Underworld Unleashed crossover event. Both are pawns in the demon Neron's plans to give many of the DC Universe's supervillains and superheroes their heart's desires in exchange for their souls or for completing a task for him.

Day of Vengeance

Satanus reveals to Superman that he is Collin Thornton when the Spectre arrives in Metropolis as part of his mission to destroy all evil magic during the Day of Vengeance miniseries as part of Alexander Luthor Jr.'s plot.

Reign in Hell and afterward

Blaze and Satanus are major characters in the Reign in Hell miniseries. In this story, they have become the rulers of Purgatory and lead a rebellion against Hell by offering "hope to the hopeless", which has never happened before. They are opposed by Neron, other demons and the magical superheroes of the DC Universe.

Blaze contacts Mary Marvel, offering to restore her lost powers in exchange for killing Freddy Freeman so that she can have his powers. Mary appears to go along with it, seemingly poisoning Freddy; however, when Blaze arrives, Freddy gets up and fights her, eventually impaling her on an iron statue and using his lightning to send her back to Hell. Now, Blaze seems to be interested in manipulating Osiris.

Satanus sends the Justice League to Hell, where the League thwarts Satanus' plans to get the nine pieces of Dante's mask. Satanus attempts to use the mask to become all-powerful, but is prevented by Plastic Man, who is possessed by the mask. The mask is then destroyed by the combined efforts of the League and Zauriel helps the League escape from Hell.

The New 52
In the New 52, the histories of the characters changes; unlike the previous iterations, it is unknown if the character's relationship with the Wizard Shazam remains intact, as the character is changed to be a Aboriginial deity whose real name is Mamaragan. The nature of their abiltieis and characterization differs; Blaze is portrayaed capable of speaking in simplified language and Satanus is protrayed as a supreme overlord of the a extradimensional demonic underworld, the Dark Realm. Relations between the characters also isn't specified.

Supergrl: Red Daughter of Krypton 
Blaze is revealed to be an inamate at the block, having been previously been trapped in a xenocontainment unit by Dr. Shay Veritas, who felt forced to trapped her due to her hostility when the Block accidentally brought her abord the research fascility alongisde a portion of her home realm. She is later set freed when Veritas attempted to persuade Blaze to defeat Supergirl and Lobo. While the two were later teleported out of the Block to prevent further damage, Blaze escapes after using a transmuted computer terminal to determine the location of Supergirl and track her down and uses her magic to teleport out.

Powers and abilities
The twins possess similar sets of power and abilities befitting their demonic heritage; despite appearances, Blaze is considered the more powerful of the twins, having bested her brother in their original incarnations for control of the netherworld. The two can also share power with one another in given circumstances.

Blaze's powers and abilities 
In her original incarnation, Blaze is considerded a powerful demon of supernatural might; in her home netherrealm, her power is virtually limitless and can both animate rock and control all of the fire and lava within the realm at will. Additionally, she has the power to control the souls of others, transport herself between dimensions, and alter both her size and appearances. Those who fall prey to her demonic powers are forced to do her bidding as her servants. In much later storylines, she eventually absorbs the power of her brother, ascending her to higher levels capable of enthralling the likes of Etrigan and ruling Hell in place of both her brother and Neron. After the New 52, Blaze retains some of her sorcerous powers in which includes transmutation, invisibility, superhuman and the power to bend space. Veritas speculated, despite admitting to not fully comprehending Blaze's powerset, that she was the only being capable of contending with both Supergirl and Lobo, a Kryptonian and Czarnian respectively.

Satanus's powers and abilities 
In his original incarnation, Satanus is considered a powerful demon of supernatural might like his sister; he is capable of producing eldritch energies, transporting himself through different dimensions, and also alter the size and appearance of himself at will. He sometimes carries a mystical gnawed, forked staff that can produce blasts of mystical hellfire. Unlike her sister, however, he retains a sliver of powers inherited from his father in which allows for supernatural effect by invoking "Shazam"; when used, he reverted Neron to a more vulnerable, depowered form. After the New 52, Satanus's power differs slightly; he possess a supernatural physical prowess derived from a demonic nature and has powers including dimenional travel, the ability to alter reality, and flight.

Other versions
An alternate version of Blaze and (presumably) Satanus appear as creations of Lex Luthor to use against Superman in Superman: Red Son.

In other media 

 Blaze and Satanus both make a cameo appearances in Black Adam as among the unnamed demons in the Rock of Finality. In the film, both of them serve as being among those whom empower the Demonic Champion, Sabbac, in a role similar to the Wizard and the six gods for Shazam. When Ishmael Gregor is killed by Black Adam and sent to the Rock of Finality, Blaze, Satanus and others demons grant him their powers to unleash Hell on Earth as their chosen champion.

See also
List of Superman enemies

References

External links
 DCU Guide: Blaze
 DCU Guide: Satanus
 Superman Homepage: Lord Satanus

Comics characters introduced in 1992
Comics characters introduced in 1990
Characters created by Roger Stern
DC Comics demons
DC Comics supervillains
DC Comics fantasy characters
DC Comics characters who use magic
DC Comics hybrids
Fictional half-demons
Fictional duos
Superman characters
Sibling duos
Captain Marvel (DC Comics)

de:Schurken im Superman-Universum#Blaze und Satanus